The Hellenic Aeronautical Engineers Society (HAES) (Greek: Σύλλογος Ελλήνων Αεροναυπηγών) is the society of professional licensed Aeronautical Engineers in Greece.

The purpose of HAES is to provide a basis where Greek licensed Aeronautical Engineers can fraternize and coordinate scientific and professional efforts to assist the state and support, develop and promote aviation and space activities.

HAES was first registered in 1975 as a society (non commercial) and it is a branch organization of the Hellenic Technical (Engineering) Chambers (Τεχνικό Επιμελητήριο Ελλάδας) in Greece. The Society is a member and the national representative in the International Council of the Aeronautical Sciences (ICAS), the Council of European Aerospace Societies (CEAS) and the European Federation of National Engineering Associations (FEANI).

The society numbers approximately 250 members, almost all having university degrees in Aeronautical Engineering from countries outside Greece (mostly United Kingdom, Italy, Germany, France and the United States) due to practically non-existence of such academic programs in Greece until recently.

The main requirement for one to become a member is to have Professional License in Aeronautical Engineering from the Hellenic Technical Chambers in Greece and be in a good standing with the chamber.

References

External links
Official website

Engineering societies based in Greece
Aerospace engineering organizations